The men's welterweight (69 kilograms) event at the 2010 Asian Games took place from 17 to 25 November 2010 at Lingnan Mingzhu Gymnasium, Foshan, China.

Schedule
All times are China Standard Time (UTC+08:00)

Results 
Legend
RSC — Won by referee stop contest
RSCO — Won by referee stop contest outscored
WO — Won by walkover

Final

Top half

Bottom half

References

External links
Official website

Men's 069